Harold Reginald Bankart (November 16, 1881 – January 31, 1939) was the head football coach for the Rensselaer Polytechnic Institute Engineers football team in 1910. He compiled a record of 2–4–2.

Head coaching record

References

1881 births
1939 deaths
Dartmouth Big Green football players
RPI Engineers football coaches
Sportspeople from Newton, Massachusetts
English players of American football
English emigrants to the United States